John Bancroft may refer to:
John Bancroft (bishop) (1574–1640), bishop of Oxford
John Bancroft (dramatist) (died 1696), English dramatist
John Bancroft (architect) (1928–2011), British architect
John Bancroft (sexologist) (born 1936), American physician
John Bancroft (businessman) (21st century), British businessman